Arnold was an urban district in the English ceremonial county of Nottinghamshire from 1894 to 1974. It was created under the Local Government Act 1894.

The district was abolished in 1974 under the Local Government Act 1972 and combined with Carlton Urban District and part of Basford Rural District to form the new Gedling district.

Politics

Arnold Urban District Council was controlled by both the Labour Party and Conservative Party during its existence. The table below shows the number of councillors held by each party from 1956 to 1973.

References

Districts of England created by the Local Government Act 1894
Districts of England abolished by the Local Government Act 1972
History of Nottinghamshire
Urban districts of Nottinghamshire
Gedling